Greyhound for Breakfast is a collection of short stories by the Scottish writer James Kelman first published in 1988. The collection was awarded the Cheltenham Prize for Literature in 1987.

References

Short story collections by James Kelman
1988 short story collections
Secker & Warburg books